The 2016 BWF Future Series was the 2016 season of the BWF Future Series.

Schedule
Below is the schedule released by Badminton World Federation:

Canceled Tournament

Results

Winners

Performance by countries
Tabulated below are the Future Series based on countries. Only countries who have won a title are listed:

References

BWF Future Series
BWF Future Series